The Kennedy Space Center Headquarters Building is an eight-story office building that houses the administrative offices of NASA's John F. Kennedy Space Center (KSC). Constructed in April 2019, and also known as the Central Campus Facility, it incorporates the offices of the space center director, management staff, personnel, procurement and several hundred contractor and support workers. The building also houses the KSC Library, travel office, film and photo archives, photo processing shops, the Engineering Document Center, print shop, mail room, credit union and KSC security offices. The new eight story building houses 200,000 sq (18,580 sq m) of floor space, filled with modern offices (designed to resemble the original decor in the former building) and its other facilities integrated into one roof, and has air conditioning and energy-efficient adjustable LED lighting installed throughout.

Background

As part of NASA's recent directives to expand and modernize the space center industrial complex to allow greater potential in the next space exploration programs, the Kennedy Space Center management office (including Robert D. Cabana) contracted Orlando-based architects and engineers to design and build a new headquarters building to replace the deteriorating current (now former) building adjascent to the site.

The center's Master Plan directrive spans a 20-year horizon and details the land uses, business policies and infrastructure needed for the center to remain the prime launch site for the rising industry of government and commercial providers.

Original Building

KSC headquarters used to reside in a former three-story six-winged concrete foam structure. It is located on 1 Street in the Industrial Area of KSC on Merritt Island, Florida, and was formally opened on May 26, 1965, and contained 439,446 square ft (40,824 square m) of floor space.

The old building - which is over 50 years old, was vacated at the end of April 2019 (as employees moved into the new 8 story facility), and originally left partially occupied to allow the possibility of interior renovations. However sadly due to a combination of material decay, rising electrical power costs, unattended and empty areas, and the hazardous asbestos lining the entire walls, it was deemed too costly to renovate. This building is in the process of being demolished and has been abandoned by NASA as of January 2020.

Notes

References and external links
Brevard County listings at National Register of Historic Places

Buildings and structures in Merritt Island, Florida
Kennedy Space Center
National Register of Historic Places in Brevard County, Florida
Headquarters in the United States
1965 establishments in Florida
Government buildings completed in 1965